The DFS 331 was a transport glider prototype developed in a collaboration between DFS and Gotha. It was a twenty-seat troop transport designed by Hans Jacobs, who had previously produced the successful, nine seat DFS 230.

The visibility from the cockpit was good, with the entire nose being glazed, and the body was very wide, allowing it to carry light Flak guns and small military vehicles. A single prototype was built and flown in 1941. The project was passed over in favour of the Gotha Go 242.

Specifications

See also

References

Further reading
 

1930s German military transport aircraft
Glider aircraft
World War II transport aircraft of Germany
DFS 331
Aircraft first flown in 1942